Dark Money (stylized Dark Mon£y) is a 2019 British drama miniseries written by Levi David Addai. The drama deals with the sexual abuse of a minor by a film producer, and the challenges his family faces thereafter when they receive hush money to keep silent.

Plot
The family of an abused child accepts hush money from a famous filmmaker to remain silent.

Production
Screenwriter Levi David Addai was inspired to write the miniseries when he was sitting in his car on a Saturday morning, people-watching and waiting for his daughter to finish her drama lesson. He found it interesting that the parents who were kind of offering up their children, and absorbing all the hopes and dreams of what the course leaders and the academy leaders were kind of selling were so trusting of the virtual strangers.

Cast

 Babou Ceesay as Manny Mensah 
 Jill Halfpenny as Sam Mensah 
 Olive Gray as Jess Mensah 
 Max Fincham as Isaac Mensah 
 Ellen Thomas as Maggie Mensah
 Susie Wokoma as Sabrina Stevens
 Tut Nyuot as Tyrone Stevens-Mensah
 Rudi Dharmalingam as Dominic Nadesan 
 Rebecca Front as Cheryl Denon
 John Schwab as Jotham Starr
 Joseph May as Brett Huntley
 Arnold Oceng as Ryan Osei
 Lin Blakley as Avril Allen
 Henry Garrett as Mitch Colney

Episodes

Critical reception
The Guardian gave it three stars and called it 'slight', stating that the subject matter was powerful, but its characters were 'not yet fine-grained enough for us to feel their personal agony and loss. Also, the question of what we would do in their situation is too far removed from likelihood to be a compelling draw.' The Independent gave it four stars.

References

External links
 

2010s British television miniseries
2019 British television series debuts
2019 British television series endings
2010s British drama television series
2010s British crime television series